Fucking may refer to:

 Fucking, an English profanity derived from fuck
 Fucking, a synonym for sexual intercourse
 Fugging, Upper Austria, a village known as Fucking until 2021
 Fugging, Lower Austria, a village known as Fucking until 1836

See also 
 Fakkin, abbreviation of Japanese restaurant First Kitchen
 Fuck (disambiguation)
 Fuckersberg, a village in Austria
 Fugging (disambiguation)
 Fukin (disambiguation)
 Fuqing
 Fuxing (disambiguation)